Rat Portage 38B is a First Nations reserve on Lake of the Woods in Kenora District, Ontario. It is one of the reserves of the Anishinabe of Wauzhushk Onigum.

References

Anishinaabe reserves in Ontario
Communities in Kenora District